Elizabeth Gitau is a Kenyan physician and corporate executive, who serves as the chief executive officer of Kenya Medical Association, the national industry association that aims at championing and preserving the interests of the medical doctors practicing in the country.

Background and education
Gitau was born in Kenya . She graduated from the University of Nairobi with a Bachelor of Medicine and Bachelor of Surgery (MBChB) degree in 2012. She went on to obtain a Master of Business Administration degree from Strathmore University in Nairobi in 2016. In 2017, she was awarded a scholarship from the German Academic Exchange Service (German: Deutscher Akademischer Austauschdienst) (DAAD), to study in Germany, where she undertook a Research Methodology & Project Management Course at the Hamburg University of Applied Sciences.

Career
After graduating from medical school, and after the mandatory internship, she worked as a medical officer at Muranga County Hospital for nearly two years until December 2014.

As of April 2019, Gitau had worked as a senior lecturer at the Kenya Medical Training College, a school that trains clinical officers (formerly medical assistants) at diploma level, based at the campus in the town of Thika.

As the incoming CEO at Kenya Medical Association, she took over from Stella Bosire, who led the association from 2017 until 2019.  Previously, Gitau was the treasurer of the Nairobi County Division of Kenya Medical Association (KMA).

See also
 Stellah Wairimu Bosire-Otieno
 Shitsama Nyamweya
 Stellah Wairimu Bosire-Otieno

References

Living people
1986 births
21st-century Kenyan women scientists
21st-century Kenyan scientists
Kenyan healthcare managers
Kenyan women physicians
University of Nairobi alumni
21st-century Kenyan businesswomen
21st-century Kenyan businesspeople